Thuringian sausage, or Thüringer Bratwurst in German  is a unique sausage from the German state of Thuringia which has protected geographical indication status under European Union law.

History

Thuringian sausage has been produced for hundreds of years. The oldest known reference to a Thuringian sausage is located in the Thuringian State Archive in Rudolstadt in a transcript of a bill from an Arnstadt convent from the year 1404.  The oldest known recipe dates from 1613 and is kept in the State Archive in Weimar, another is listed in the "Thüringisch-Erfurtische Kochbuch" from 1797 which also mentions a smoked variety.

Production
Only finely minced pork, beef, or sometimes veal, is used in production. Most of the meat comes from the upper part from around the shoulder. In addition to salt and pepper, caraway, marjoram, and garlic are used. The specific spice mixtures can vary according to traditional recipes or regional tastes. At least 51% of the ingredients must come from the state of Thuringia. These ingredients are blended together and filled into a pig or sheep intestine.  Thuringian sausages are distinguished from the dozens of unique types of German wursts by the distinctive spices (which includes marjoram) and their low fat content (25% as compared to up to 60% in other sausages).

According to German minced meat law, the Hackfleischverordnung, raw sausages must be sold on the day of their creation or until the closing of a late-night establishment. Previously grilled sausages have a shelf-life of 15 days, and sausages immediately frozen after their creation may be stored for 6 months.

Preparation
The preferred preparation method for Thuringian sausage is roasted over charcoal or on a grill rubbed with bacon. The fire shouldn't be so hot that the skin breaks. However, some charring is desired.  The sausages are sometimes sprinkled with beer during the grilling process.

Usually, a Thuringian sausage is presented in a cut-open roll and served with mustard.

Thuringian culture

For the people of Thuringia, grilled Thuringian sausage is not merely the local cuisine.  The grill is at the very core of Thuringian culture. Mostly beer instead of water is used to cool the grill, and the type of grill is a matter of doctrine. Mustard, preferably local, is the traditional condiment. Most commonly used is "Born mustard" from a local food company in Erfurt. In some regions the usage of any relish - even mustard - is a strict taboo. In eastern of Thuringia most commonly used is "Bautz’ner" mustard.

In 2006, the Deutsches Bratwurstmuseum, opened in Holzhausen, part of the Wachsenburggemeinde near Arnstadt, the first museum devoted exclusively to the Thuringian sausage.

In 2016, a kosher version of Thuringian bratwurst made with veal and chicken packed into goat intestines was introduced at the annual Onion Festival in Weimar, which took place between Rosh Hashanah and Yom Kippur. The introduction of the kosher bratwurst sparked some backlash on social media with comments posted that were "full of hate, anti-religious sentiment and National Socialist cliches", according to the Governor of Thuringia.

North America
In North America, the term Thuringer refers to Thuringer cervelat, a type of smoked semi-dry sausage similar to summer sausage. It is made from a medium grind of beef, blended with salt, cure ingredients, spices (usually including dry mustard), and a lactic acid starter culture.  After stuffing into a fibrous casing, it is smoked and dried, then cooked.  Hormel Foods Corporation and Usinger's, as well as many regional processors and some small butcher shops, produce the sausage in this fashion.

Luxembourg

Prior to Thuringian sausages being given protected geographical region status in the EU, a type of Luxembourgish sausage was locally known as a Thüringer. It is now referred to as "Lëtzebuerger Grillwurscht".

See also
Cervelat
Summer sausage
Thüringer rotwurst (black pudding)
 List of sausages

References

Thuringer sausage
German products with protected designation of origin
Sausage
Fresh sausages

de:Bratwurst#Thüringer Rostbratwurst